Hrana saga hrings is one of the sagas of Icelanders. Written around the 13th-14th century,  existing now  only in manuscripts from 1824 transcribed by  Gísli Brynjúlfsson (1794-1827) in the manuscript KBAdd 62 4to.
The saga tells  of the adventures of Hrani Ring (Hrani hringr) so named since he had a red ring on his left cheek.

References

External links
Hrana saga hrings Full text at the Icelandic Saga Database 

Sagas of Icelanders